A catechol-O-methyltransferase (COMT) inhibitor is a drug that inhibits the enzyme catechol-O-methyltransferase. This enzyme methylates catecholamines such as dopamine, norepinephrine and epinephrine. It also methylates levodopa. COMT inhibitors are indicated for the treatment of Parkinson's disease in combination with levodopa and an aromatic L-amino acid decarboxylase inhibitor (e.g. carbidopa or benserazide). The therapeutic benefit of using a COMT inhibitor is based on its ability to prevent the methylation of levodopa to 3-O-methyldopa, thus increasing the bioavailability of levodopa. COMT inhibitors significantly decrease off time in people with Parkinson's disease also taking carbidopa/levodopa.

List of COMT inhibitors 
 entacapone (Comtan, Comtess, Stalevo)
nebicapone
 nitecapone 
 opicapone (Ongentys)
 tolcapone (Tasmar)

Entacapone and opicapone are peripheral inhibitors, unable to cross the blood-brain barrier. Tolcapone is able to cross the blood-brain barrier. Tolcapone has been associated with at least three fatal cases of acute liver failure and is thus only rarely prescribed. Patients taking tolcapone must be monitored for hepatic failure. Entacapone and opicapone have not been associated with hepatotoxicity.

Adverse effects 

 nausea
 orthostatic hypotension
 vivid dreams 
 confusion
 hallucinations
 hepatotoxicity (only tolcapone)
 diarrhea
 drowsiness
 urine discoloration
 dyskinesia

See also 
Medication Management of Parkinson's disease
catechol-O-methyltransferase
entacapone
carbidopa/levodopa/entacapone
tolcapone
opicapone
nitecapone

References 

Catechol-O-methyltransferase inhibitors